William J. Cayce House is a historic house located at 517 Holland Avenue in Cayce, Lexington County, South Carolina.

Description and history 
The two-story vernacular Classical Revival style house is sheathed in weatherboard and was built in 1917 by architect Hugh Summers. It features wood Doric order columns across the entire front porch. The upstairs center porch has four smaller columns with a pediment. It was built for merchant William J. Cayce, founder of the town. It was one of the first residences constructed in the city and one of the last such dwellings remaining.

It was listed on the National Register of Historic Places on April 16, 1975.

References

Houses on the National Register of Historic Places in South Carolina
Neoclassical architecture in South Carolina
Houses completed in 1917
Houses in Lexington County, South Carolina
National Register of Historic Places in Lexington County, South Carolina